Mentzelia reflexa is a species of flowering plant in the family Loasaceae known by the common name reflexed blazingstar.

It is native to the Mojave Desert and adjacent mountain ranges in California and Nevada, where it grows in rocky habitat and sometimes disturbed areas.

Description
It is an annual herb growing up to 20 centimeters tall and taking a rounded or clumped form. The abundant leaves are up to 10 centimeters long and toothed along the edges. The inflorescence is a cluster of flowers each with eight pale yellow petals. The fruit is a cylindrical utricle roughly a centimeter long containing many tiny bumpy white seeds.

External links
Jepson Manual Treatment
Photo gallery

reflexa
Flora of Nevada
Flora of the California desert regions
Natural history of the Mojave Desert
Flora without expected TNC conservation status